The Politburo or Polit Bureau is the highest body of the Communist Party of India (Marxist). The members of the Politburo are elected by the Central Committee in the immediate aftermath of a National Party Congress, which is held every three years.

23rd Politburo
23rd Party Congress
Date: 06 - 10th April 2022
Venue: Kannur, Kerala

A 17-member Politburo elected by the Central Committee with 3 new entrants.

22nd Politburo
The  22nd Congress of the CPI(M) held between April 18 and 22 2018 at Hyderabad, Telangana elected a 95 member Central Committee. There are also six special invitees and two permanent invitees to the Central Committee. The Central Committee at its meeting held on April 22, 2018 at the conclusion of the Congress elected a 17 member Polit Bureau. The C.C. also re-elected Com. Sitaram Yechury as the General Secretary.

21st Politburo
The 21st Politburo was elected at the 21st party congress of CPI(M), held in Visakhapatnam in April 2015.

Sitaram Yechury,  General Secretary
Subhashini Ali
M. A. Baby
Kodiyeri Balakrishnan
Biman Bose
Surja Kanta Mishra
Prakash Karat
A. K. Padmanabhan
B. V. Raghavulu
S. Ramachandran Pillai
G.Ramakrishnan
Mohammed Salim
Manik Sarkar
Pinarayi Vijayan

20th Politburo
The 20th Politburo was elected at the 20th party congress of CPI(M), held in Calicut in April 2012.
Prakash Karat, General Secretary
M. A. Baby
Kodiyeri Balakrishnan
Buddhadeb Bhattacharya
Biman Bose
Brinda Karat
Surja Kanta Mishra
A. K. Padmanabhan
B.V. Raghavulu
S. Ramachandran Pillai
Manik Sarkar
Nirupam Sen
K. Varadarajan
Pinarayi Vijayan
Sitaram Yechury

19th Politburo
The 19th Politburo was elected at the 19th party congress of CPI(M), held in Coimbatore from 29 March – 3 April 2008.
Prakash Karat, General Secretary
V. S. Achuthanandan (removed from the politburo on 12 July 2009)
Mohammed Amin
Kodiyeri Balakrishnan
Buddhadeb Bhattacharya
Biman Bose
Brinda Karat
M. K. Pandhe
B.V. Raghavulu
S. Ramachandran Pillai
Manik Sarkar
Nirupam Sen
K. Varadarajan
Pinarayi Vijayan
Sitaram Yechury

18th Politburo
The 18th Politburo was elected at the 18th party congress of CPI(M), held in Delhi from 6-11 April 2005.

Prakash Karat, General Secretary
V. S. Achuthanandan
Jyoti Basu
Buddhadeb Bhattacharya
Anil Biswas (died on 26 March 2006)
Biman Bose
Brinda Karat
Chittabrata Majumdar (died on 20 February 2007)
M. K. Pandhe
S. Ramachandran Pillai
B. V. Raghavulu
Harkishan Singh Surjeet
Manik Sarkar
R. Umanath
K. Varadarajan
Pinarayi Vijayan
Sitaram Yechury

17th Politburo
The 17th Politburo was elected at the 18th party congress of CPI(M), held in Hyderabad from 19-24 March 2002.
 Harkishan Singh Surjeet, General Secretary
 V. S. Achuthanandan
 E. Balanandan
 Jyoti Basu
 Biman Bose
 Buddhadeb Bhattacharya
 Anil Biswas
 Prakash Karat
 E. K. Nayanar
 M. K. Pandhe
 S. Ramachandran Pillai
 P. Ramachandran
 Manik Sarkar
 Kortala Satyanarayana
 R. Umanath
 Pinarayi Vijayan
 Sitaram Yechury

16th Politburo
The 16th Politburo was elected at the 16th party congress of CPI(M), held in Calcutta from 5-11 October 1998.
 Harkishan Singh Surjeet, General Secretary
 V. S. Achuthanandan
 E. Balanandan
 Jyoti Basu
 Biman Bose
 Anil Biswas
 Sailen Dasgupta
 Prakash Karat
 E. K. Nayanar
 M. K. Pandhe
 S. Ramachandran Pillai
 P. Ramachandran
 Manik Sarkar
 R. Umanath
 Pinarayi Vijayan
 Sitaram Yechury

15th Politburo
The 15th Politburo was elected at the 15th party congress of CPI(M), held in Chandigarh from 2-8 April 1995.

 Harkishan Singh Surjeet, General Secretary
 V. S. Achuthanandan
 E. Balanandan
 Jyoti Basu
 Benoy Chaudhury
 Sailen Dasgupta
 Prakash Karat
 Sunil Maitra
 E. M. S. Namboodiripad
 E. K. Nayanar
 S. Ramachandran Pillai
 P. Ramachandran
 L.B.G. Rao
 R. Umanath
 Sitaram Yechury

14th Politburo
The 14th Politburo was elected at the 14th party congress of CPI(M), held in Madras from 3-10 January 1992.

 Harkishan Singh Surjeet, General Secretary
 V. S. Achuthanandan
 E. Balanandan
 Jyoti Basu
 Nripen Chakraborty
 Benoy Chaudhury
 Sailen Dasgupta
 Prakash Karat
 Sunil Maitra
 A. Nallasivam
 E. M. S. Namboodiripad
 E. K. Nayanar
 S. Ramachandran Pillai
 P. Ramachandran
 L.B.G. Rao
 M. Hanumantha Rao
 Sitaram Yechury

13th Politburo
The 13th Politburo was elected at the 13th party congress of CPI(M), held in Trivandrum in January 1989.

 E. M. S. Namboodiripad, General Secretary
 V. S. Achuthanandan
 E. Balanandan
 M. Basavapunniah
 Jyoti Basu
 Nripen Chakraborty
 Samar Mukherjee
 Saroj Mukherjee
 A. Nallasivam
 B. T. Ranadive
 L.B.G. Rao
 Harkishan Singh Surjeet

12th Politburo
The 12th Politburo was elected at the 12th party congress of CPI(M), held in Calcutta from 24-29 December 1986.

 E. M. S. Namboodiripad, General Secretary
 V. S. Achuthanandan
 E. Balanandan
 M. Basavapunniah
 Jyoti Basu
 Nripen Chakraborty
 Samar Mukherjee
 Saroj Mukherjee
 B. T. Ranadive
 Harkishan Singh Surjeet

11th Politburo
The 11th Politburo was elected at the 11th party congress of CPI(M), held in Vijayawada from 26-31 January 1982.

 E. M. S. Namboodiripad, General Secretary
 E. Balanandan
 M. Basavapunniah
 Jyoti Basu
 Promode Dasgupta (died on 29 November 1982)
 Samar Mukherjee
 P. Ramamurthi
 B. T. Ranadive
 Harkishan Singh Surjeet

10th Politburo
The 10th Politburo was elected at the 10th party congress of CPI(M), held in Jalandhar from 2-8 April 1978.

 E. M. S. Namboodiripad, General Secretary
 E. Balanandan
 A. Balasubramaniam
 M. Basavapunniah
 Jyoti Basu
 Promode Dasgupta
 Samar Mukherjee
 P. Ramamurthi
 B. T. Ranadive
 P. Sundarayya
 Harkishan Singh Surjeet

9th Politburo
The 9th Politburo was elected at the 10th party congress of CPI(M), held in Madurai from 27 June – 2 July 1972.

 P. Sundarayya, General Secretary
 M. Basavapunniah
 Jyoti Basu
 A. K. Gopalan
 Promode Dasgupta
 E. M. S. Namboodiripad
 P. Ramamurthi
 B. T. Ranadive
 Harkishan Singh Surjeet

8th Politburo
The 8th Politburo was elected at the 8th party congress of CPI(M), held in Kochi from 23 - 29 December 1968.

 P. Sundarayya, General Secretary
 M. Basavapunniah
 Jyoti Basu
 A. K. Gopalan
 Promode Dasgupta
 E. M. S. Namboodiripad
 P. Ramamurthi
 B. T. Ranadive
 Harkishan Singh Surjeet

7th Politburo
The 7th Politburo was elected at the 7th Party Congress of CPI(M) held in Calcutta from 31 October – 7 November 1964. It was the first Party Congress after the CPI(M) emerged from a split from the Communist Party of India in 1964. Before the 7th Party Congress, the Politburo was known as the Central Secretariat.

 P. Sundarayya, General Secretary
 M. Basavapunniah
 Jyoti Basu
 A. K. Gopalan
 Promode Dasgupta
 E. M. S. Namboodiripad
 P. Ramamurthi
 B. T. Ranadive
 Harkishan Singh Surjeet

See also
All India Congress Committee
National Executive of the Bharatiya Janata Party

References

Politburos
Communist Party of India (Marxist)
Leaders of political parties in India